Vengeance is a 2022 American black comedy film written and directed by B. J. Novak, in his directorial debut. The film stars Novak, Boyd Holbrook, Dove Cameron, Issa Rae, and Ashton Kutcher. Jason Blum is a producer under his Blumhouse Productions banner, and Greg Gilreath and Adam Hendricks are producers under their Divide/Conquer banner.

Vengeance had its world premiere at the Tribeca Festival on June 12, 2022, and was released in the United States on July 29, 2022, by Focus Features. The film received generally favorable reviews from critics.

Plot

New York City journalist Ben Manalowitz lives a metropolitan life of casual romantic relationships. Late one night, he receives a phone call from a stranger, Ty Shaw, informing him that his "girlfriend," Abilene "Abby" Shaw, has died of an apparent drug overdose. In actuality, Abby was one of Ben's many casual romantic relationships whom Ben barely remembers. At Ty's insistence, Ben flies to Texas to attend the funeral. He meets Abby's family: brother Ty, mother Sharon, sisters Paris and Kansas City, younger brother Mason (referred to as "El Stupido"), and Granny Carole. 

Ty informs Ben that he suspects Abby was actually murdered, adamantly maintaining that she never took drugs, and asks Ben to accompany him to find the truth and avenge her. After conferring with his podcast producer Eloise, Ben elects to aid them as part of a story about grief and denial.

Ben and Ty meet Ty's friend Crawl, who explains that parties often occur at the oil fields and tells Ben of an area nearby the fields dubbed "the Afterparty", an area between law enforcement jurisdictions where dead bodies have been reported over time. Crawl and Ty suspect Sancholo, a local drug dealer, as responsible for Abby's death. Ben meets Quentin Sellers, an eccentric record producer who, like Ben, is an outsider and college-educated but has come to adopt Texas as his home. Quentin gives Ben a memory stick with recordings of Abby performing. Ben confronts Sancholo to discuss Abby's death, who reveals he was in Tulsa on the night of Abby's death. Ben later joins the Shaw family at a rodeo, where he accidentally draws the crowd's ire by expressing support for the Texas Longhorns when the crowd is overwhelmingly in favor of the Texas Tech Red Raiders.

Ben's car explodes. Later, Ben receives a call from Eloise, telling him that the story is complete and to return home, to his dismay. At dinner with the Shaws at Whataburger, Granny mentions that Abby was, in fact, a drug user and that Ty had lied to Ben to try and get closer to her supposed boyfriend. Leaving the restaurant, Ben reveals that he was not close with Abby and criticizes the Shaws' lives and mentalities.

Later, Mason mentions how Abby would speak in code with him, saying "1435" (for the letters in "I love you mucho"). Enlightened, Ben uses the number to unlock Abby's phone, finding a contact labeled "Ben" and messages indicating that Abby was abandoned by this person as she died.

Armed with one of Ty's pistols, Ben rides with Mason to a party at the oil fields. Ben learns that his car was bombed by Texas Tech fans from the rodeo. Ben finds Ty and Quentin, and the latter invites him to a private tent to converse. Inside, Ben notices a stash of opioids and witnesses an unconscious woman being dragged from the tent. After turning off his recorder, Ben elicits a confession from Quentin, who confirms that he caused Abby to overdose and left her to die. Ben reveals that he recorded the confession on his phone, to which Quentin responds with a speech about the nature of Ben's story and how ever-questioning audiences will shift their negative attention from Quentin to Ben and then toward the Shaws. Ben executes Quentin with Ty's pistol. Upon returning to the Shaw house, Ben reconciles with Ty and Sharon. Before departing from Texas, Ben deletes his recordings, electing to keep the story between the Shaws and himself.

Cast

Production
Between 2015 and 2018, B. J. Novak, who lives in Los Angeles, California, took several trips to Texas to do research for a film he wanted to write about a blue state podcaster who travels to a red state. In March 2020, it was announced Novak would direct and star in the film, with Issa Rae, Ashton Kutcher, and Boyd Holbrook joining the cast.

Principal photography began in Albuquerque, New Mexico in March 2020, but was halted due to the COVID-19 pandemic. In January 2021, Isabella Amara joined the cast and production resumed that month. In March 2021, J. Smith-Cameron and  Lio Tipton joined the cast, with Focus Features set to distribute.

Finneas O'Connell composed the film score. The soundtrack was released by Back Lot Music.

Release
Vengeance premiered on June 12, 2022, at the Tribeca Festival and was theatrically released in the United States on July 29, 2022. On September 16, 2022, it was released on Peacock to stream exclusively on the platform. The film was released on Blu-ray and DVD 4 days later on September 20, 2022.

Box office
In the United States and Canada, Vengeance was released alongside DC League of Super-Pets, and was projected to gross around $2 million from 998 theaters on its opening weekend. The film made $650,000 on its first day and a total of $1.8 million over the weekend, finishing 10th. Deadline Hollywood noted that while the amount was "not super," being a low-budget film that received a theatrical release would make it "more attractive and stand-out in a streaming and PVOD menu." The film fell 60% to $720,000 in its second weekend.

Critical response 
On the review aggregator website Rotten Tomatoes, 81% of 158 critics' reviews are positive, with an average rating of 6.9/10. The website's critical consensus reads, "Writer-director-star B.J. Novak could have taken a sharper approach to this dark comedy's deeper themes, but if you're in the mood for a slyly smart mystery, Vengeance is yours." Metacritic, which uses a weighted average, assigned the film a score of 65 out of 100, based on 39 critics, indicating "generally favorable reviews". Audiences polled by CinemaScore gave the film an average grade of "B+" on an A+ to F scale, while PostTrak gave the film a 76% overall positive score, with 57% saying they would definitely recommend it.

References

External links
 
 
 

2022 black comedy films
2022 directorial debut films
2022 thriller films
2020s comedy thriller films
2020s English-language films
American black comedy films
American comedy thriller films
Blumhouse Productions films
Film productions suspended due to the COVID-19 pandemic
Films about journalists
Films produced by Jason Blum
Films set in New York City
Films set in Texas
Films shot in New Mexico
2020s American films